Aphrophora gelida, the boreal spittlebug, is a species of spittlebug in the family Aphrophoridae. It is found in North America.

References

Further reading

External links

 

Insects described in 1851
Aphrophoridae